Edward Welch (1806 – 3 August 1868) was a British architect born in Overton, Flintshire, in North Wales. Having been a pupil of John Oates at Halifax, West Yorkshire, he formed a partnership in  1828 with Joseph Hansom, who later invented the hansom cab and founded The Builder. Together they designed several churches in Yorkshire and Liverpool, and also worked on the Isle of Anglesey. In 1831 they won the competition to design Birmingham Town Hall. However they were obliged to stand surety for the builders, which led to their bankruptcy and the dissolution of the partnership in 1834. In 1835 Welch prepared plans for Benjamin Gummow for the partial rebuilding of St Mary's Church, Ruabon.

Hansom & Welch designed a number of buildings on the Isle of Man, most notably King William's College, where Welch's brother, John Welch also designed several churches independently. Edward Welch Also designed Christchurch, A large church in Harpurhey Manchester. This church was built on the Harpurhey side of the toll gate to allow congregations to go to church, without having to go into the city and pay the toll charge. Christchurch is still standing today and has a thriving congregation.

Following his parting of ways with Hansom, Edward Welch returned to Liverpool, where he continued to practise as an architect until 1849. He died in London on 3 August 1868.

Footnotes

References 
A Biographical Dictionary of British Architects, 1600-1840 3rd Ed, H. Colvin; Yale University Press 1995

1806 births
1868 deaths
19th-century Welsh architects